Switchback is an unincorporated community in McDowell County, West Virginia, United States. Switchback had its own high school in operation from 1923 to 1953.

The community's name most likely refers to the shape of nearby railroad tracks. The James Ellwood Jones House and Pocahontas Fuel Company Store were listed on the National Register of Historic Places in 1992.

References

External links 
Elkhorn High School

Unincorporated communities in McDowell County, West Virginia
Unincorporated communities in West Virginia
Coal towns in West Virginia